Gagadon ("Gaga tooth") is an extinct genus of even-toed ungulate that lived in the early Eocene of North America. The type and only known species, Gagadon minimonstrum, was described in 2014 based on lower teeth and jaw fragments found in the Wasatch Formation of Bitter Creek, Wyoming. The genus is named in honor of the singer Lady Gaga, while the species name minimonstrum ("mini monster") refers to the small size and presence of unusual cusps on the teeth.

See also
Gaga (plant), a genus of ferns also named after Lady Gaga
Aleiodes gaga, a wasp also named after Lady Gaga
List of organisms named after famous people (born 1950–present)

References

Tylopoda
Eocene even-toed ungulates
Ypresian life
Wasatchian
Eocene mammals of North America
Fossils of the United States
Paleontology in Wyoming
Fossil taxa described in 2014
Lady Gaga
Prehistoric even-toed ungulate genera